Gary Stuart Hyde (born 28 December 1969) is an English former footballer who made 47 appearances in the Football League playing as a winger for Darlington and Scunthorpe United. He was on the books of Leicester City, without playing for them in the League, and went on to play non-league football for Whitby Town. He was a member of the Darlington team that won the 1989–90 Football Conference title.

References

1969 births
Living people
footballers from Wolverhampton
English footballers
Association football midfielders
Darlington F.C. players
Leicester City F.C. players
Scunthorpe United F.C. players
Whitby Town F.C. players
English Football League players
National League (English football) players
Northern Football League players